Ryōga, Ryoga or Ryouga (written: 崚雅 or 凌河) is a masculine Japanese given name. Notable people with the name include:

, Japanese footballer
, Japanese footballer

Fictional characters
, a character in the manga series Ranma ½

Japanese masculine given names